Green Light Teams were teams of American special forces units during the height of the Cold War.  These teams, also referred to as Atomic Demolition Munitions Specialists, were trained to advance, arm, and deploy Special Atomic Demolition Munitions (SADM) behind enemy lines. These Atomic Demolition Munitions, also known as ADMs and backpack nukes, are smaller, more portable nuclear weapons created by the United States beginning in 1954.

Size 
These initial Atomic Demolition Munitions required large teams of trained soldiers and still weighed hundreds of pounds. The United States of America's nuclear weapons developers were encouraging of the military's desire for tactical nuclear weapons. The president of one of these nuclear weapons development companies, James McRae of Sandia Corporation, was among those propelling the further development of tactical nuclear weapons, asserting: "greater emphasis should be placed on small atomic weapons".

The development of the Davy Crocket nuclear device, an atomic weapon with a sub-kiloton energy yield that can be transported on the back of a jeep, served as a precursor to the eventual final product foreseen by the military, the Mk-54 SADM. The Davy Crocket's lightweight Mark-54 composition was encouraging to the further production and advancement of smaller SADMs, such as the W-54 version, which could be carried by a single trained soldier.

Green Light Troops 
The United States of America's military leaders and President Dwight D. Eisenhower immensely feared the enormous nuclear weapons cache and manpower of the Soviet Union.  They embraced a "New Look" idea of limited nuclear war.  This new idea of limited nuclear warfare included the use of tactical nuclear weapons. Deployment of these tactical nuclear weapons required specially trained soldiers. This led to the creation of the Green Light Teams. These troops were trained and tested on their leadership, engineering, and psychology as well as their mental stability.  The recruits also underwent a thorough background check by DoD before being confirmed into the SADM program.

Green Light Team recruits would endure around twelve hours instruction in a classroom each day, while additionally working through concentrated exercises.  Robert Deifel, an officer who was recruited and a member of a Green Light Team, described the tactical training the recruits were subjected to as "very intense".  The tactical training often took place throughout the day with a short break followed by more intense tactical training well into the night. Deifel recalls exercises where they were often in the woods in the middle of the night, with the mission to reach the top of a hill.

The targets for most of the SADMs or tactical nuclear weapons were in Eastern Europe and parts of the Middle East including Iran and even Korea. Because these targets were all around the world in different locations and terrains, the Green Light Troops were trained to reach their targets by land, air, and sea. These troops were trained to sneak behind enemy lines with the tactical nuclear weapon strapped to their back. Some Green Light Teams were missioned such that simple but secret ground truck transport to the target was feasible. Some Green Light Teams were trained to transport their bomb underwater if necessary. These Green Light Troops specialized in scuba and underwater missions. Green Light teams often consisted of three men who trained using actual atomic weapons. Green Light Team member Billy Waugh recalled being launched subsurface from the U.S. nuclear attack submarine USS Grayback while carrying an actual atomic weapon, a W54 SADM. Green Light Teams wore fatigues without military markings or insignia.

Captain Tom Davis, a Green Light Team member, trained for an operation in which his team parachuted from a cargo plane behind enemy lines with the approximate  nuclear device attached to them.  Even one Green Light Team member, Bill Flavin, recalled the Green Light Team he commanded was trained to ski down a mountain with the SADM: "It skied down the mountain; you did not".

Along with all the pre-mission training, field training and technique was equally as important to the success of the operation. The team of soldiers was trained in handling nuclear weapons periodically. On the missions, the soldiers were highly trained in the handling and detonation of the tactical nuclear device, as well as its proper destruction in the case of being spotted by enemy soldiers or the mission being aborted. The team of soldiers on the Green Light missions were often instructed to deploy the nuclear device at a distance to where they could ensure their own safety as well as that of the nuclear weapon. The team members could have even been tasked with burying the nuclear device underground, typically to prevent discovery. The soldiers had to confirm that an enemy combatant would not locate the device and that it was still detonated on time without disruption.

If the two man teams reached the desired target, they would deploy the nuclear code and arm the device. After arming the device a swift retreat would ensue. The tactical nuclear devices were detonated by either mechanical or radio detonators. Since a nuclear exchange across the globe could involve Electromagnetic (EMP) bursts, the devices had backups to the electrical systems. This further added to the suicidal quality of the missions.

Kamikaze missions 
Because of the vast difficulty and extreme danger that came along with handling SADMs, the extreme versions of transportation needed for the tactical nuclear weapon, and the stealth-like, perfect manner in which the missions had to be executed, Green Light Teams are comparable to the Japanese kamikaze pilots.  The general thought of many of the members of these Green Light Teams was that these missions were near suicidal.  One Green Light Team member, Louis Frank Napoli, said of the missions: "We were kamikaze pilots without the airplanes". Robert Deifel, another Green Light Team member, said of the missions: "There was no room for error... We had to be absolutely perfect". The risk was extremely prevalent when discussing the possible time frame for when these atomic devices could ignite on a mechanical timer. This timer would become less efficient and more risky the longer the duration of the timer was set. The team members had been informed that the timers could go off up to eight minutes earlier than desired and even thirteen minutes after expected.  This would obviously create a time crisis for the Green Light team members operating the mission. If the team members were instructed to bury the nuclear device, they certainly may have been able to evade the explosion, but radioactive fallout could still cause heavy damage.

Secrecy 

As a result of the tremendous danger these missions posed, they would likely have been highly scrutinized if known to the general public. Also, if the enemy had caught wind of such plans as well, they could plan and counter accordingly. Due to these reasons, the Green Light Team missions were top secret.  The members of the teams could not even discuss their objective with their spouse.  The fact that these missions were kept top secret meant that few medals or recognition were ever bestowed upon the Green Light Team members. Former Green Light Team member Robert Deifel retired from military service with six medals, but says he received copious letters from various military personnel and generals commending him and his team members for their accomplishments.

Another key reason the SADMs and Green Light Teams operations were kept highly secretive was also due to the targets and locations of the tactical nuclear weapons. As a counter to the Warsaw Pact forces perceivably outgunning and outmanning the NATO (North Atlantic Treaty Organization) during the standstill of the Cold War, President Dwight D. Eisenhower and his generals intended for the Green Light Teams to conduct missions not only in NATO occupied countries, but also in the Warsaw Pact nations.  This new form of attack was to be used as a weapon to stop an enemy attack in its tracks or eliminate enemy nuclear devices.  In order for such an operation to be successful, especially in the midst of a total nuclear war, this form of retaliation needed to be swift and efficient. That meant that these Atomic Demolition Munitions needed to be quickly accessed and deployed. Hundreds of these tactical nuclear devices were stashed throughout Europe and in NATO's arsenal.

The Green Light Team missions were not publicly disclosed until 1984 when military documents and papers from the Natural Resources Defense Council were outlined to the public.  Many people, along with the American Congress, were skeptical of the concept of tactical nuclear devices being employed by a group of soldiers. At the time of the Atomic Demolition Munitions program's inception in the 1950s, the idea and practicality of this new smaller, tactical warfare was rational.  In the Cold War's final few years of conflict and as concepts such as "limited nuclear war" were adapted, the practicality of the weapons were "obsolete", according to President George H.W. Bush.  This further led to an increasing number of nuclear devices being relinquished or destroyed by all sides of the war. When NBC Nightly News ran two stories in the 1980s depicting the plan by the United States to operate Special Forces-led missions involving Atomic Demolition Munitions, West Germany's Defense Minister Manfred Worner led the plea for the United States to remove its Atomic Demolition Munitions cache in the area.  By 1988, the last approximately 300 SADMs owned by the United States were surrendered from the NATO arsenal.  In 1989, the SADMs weapon and the Green Light Teams were officially retired.  By the end of the war, not a single Green Light Team conducted a real mission involving SADMs.

References

United States Army Special Operations Command
Military operations involving the United States